The 1928 Wyoming Cowboys football team was an American football team that represented the University of Wyoming as a member of the Rocky Mountain Conference (RMC) during the 1928 college football season. In their second season under head coach George McLaren, the Cowboys compiled a 2–7 record (0–5 against conference opponents), finished in 11th place in the RMC, and were outscored by a total of 224 to 106.

Schedule

References

Wyoming
Wyoming Cowboys football seasons
Wyoming Cowboys football